Martim Afonso Telo de Meneses (died in Toro, 26 January 1356), was a Portuguese nobleman, member of the Téllez de Meneses lineage, and the father of  Leonor Teles, queen consort of Portugal.

His parents were Afonso Telles de Meneses, called el Raposo (the Fox), vassal of King Afonso IV of Portugal, and Berengáira Lourenço de Valadares, daughter of Lourenço Soares de Valadares and Sancha Nunes de Chacím.

Biography 

Martim Afonso was the Mayordomo of  Maria of Portugal, the wife of King Alfonso XI of Castile and mother of the only surviving son of this marriage, Peter of Castile.  On 16 January 1356, he and several nobles were at the Alcázar de Toro with the queen when King Peter of Castile arrived, accompanied by several squires, entered the grounds of the fortress and ordered the assassination of several of the men who were there with the queen, including Martim. Pero López de Ayala in his chronicles describes the events as follow:

Marriage and issue 

Martim Afonso and his wife, Aldonça Anes de Vasconcelos, daughter of João Mendes de Vasconcelos, Alcalde of Estremoz, and Aldara Alfonso Alcoforado, had the following children:

 João Afonso Telo (killed on 14 August 1385 in the Battle of Aljubarrota), 6th Count of Barcelos in 1382, mayor of Lisbon, admiral of the Kingdom of Portugal, and the husband of Beatriz de Alburquerque, an illegitimate daughter of João Afonso de Albuquerque.
 Gonçalo Teles de Meneses, (died on 28 June 1403), Count of Neiva and lord of Faria, married to Maria Afonso de Albuquerque, also an illegitimate daughter of João Afonso de Albuquerque,;
 Maria Teles de Meneses (m. November 1379), wife of Alvaro Dias de Sousa and, after his death, married infante  John of Portugal, Duke of Valencia de Campos, son of King Peter I of Portugal and Inês de Castro, parents of  Infante Fernando, Lord of Eça;
 Leonor Teles, queen consort of Portugal as the wife of King Ferdinand I of Portugal.

He was also the father of a daughter born out of wedlock:
 Joana Teles de Meneses, who married Juan Alfonso Pimentel, first Count of Benavente.

References

Bibliography 
 
 

14th-century births
1356 deaths
14th-century Portuguese people
Medieval Portugal